Dolau railway station is an unstaffed railway station with one platform serving the small village of Dolau in Powys, mid Wales. It is located on the Heart of Wales Line.

Passenger services are operated by Transport for Wales. It is a request stop for southbound trains only - those heading towards Shrewsbury have to stop here so that the train crew can activate the controls for the adjacent half barrier level crossing.

History

The station is tended to by the Dolau Station Action Group, who has decorated the platform with plants, flowers, a wooden waiting shelter and clock. The shelter houses a guestbook as well as the awards the station has received. Queen Elizabeth II unveiled a plaque at the station in 2002 commemorating her visit during the Golden Jubilee visit to Wales.

Formerly known as Dolau Halt, the suffix was dropped in 1969.

Facilities
Like most other stations on the route, it has been fitted with a digital information screen and customer help point to provide train running details. It also has a bicycle rack and payphone.

Services
It is served by four trains each direction Monday to Saturday (plus a fifth northbound service on weekdays only) and two trains each direction on Sundays.

References

Further reading

External links 

Railway stations in Powys
DfT Category F2 stations
Former London and North Western Railway stations
Railway stations in Great Britain opened in 1865
Heart of Wales Line
Railway stations served by Transport for Wales Rail
Railway request stops in Great Britain